"Syypää sun hymyyn" is a song by Finnish rapper Cheek. The song features an appearance by a singer Yasmine Yamajako. The song serves as the third single from Cheek's seventh studio album Sokka irti. The song peaked at number two on the Finnish Singles Chart in December 2012.  A music video, directed by Joonas Laaksoharju, was uploaded to YouTube in May 2012.

Chart performance

References

2012 singles
2012 songs
Cheek (rapper) songs
Warner Music Group singles